Euryope subserricornis is a species of leaf beetle of Saudi Arabia Yemen, and Egypt described by Pierre André Latreille in 1806.

References

Eumolpinae
Beetles of Asia
Insects of the Arabian Peninsula
Taxa named by Pierre André Latreille
Beetles described in 1806